Kijran, also spelled as Kajran, is a district in Daykundi province in central Afghanistan. It has an area of about 1,886 square kilometres.

Demographics 
The population of the district was reported in 2004 at about 26,259 people.

Gallery 
Additional images of Kajran District available in Wikimedia Commons.

See also 
 Districts of Afghanistan

References

External links 
 Summary of District Development Plan, 2007

Districts of Daykundi Province
Hazarajat